Aruba is an island in the Caribbean Sea, that forms part of the Kingdom of the Netherlands.

Aruba may also refer to:

 Aruba (film), a 2006 Canadian film
 "Aruba" (Legends of Tomorrow), an episode of Legends of Tomorrow
 Aruba Networks, a hardware and software vendor, now a subsidiary of Hewlett Packard Enterprise
 Aruba Dam, Kenya, East Africa
 Aruba S.p.A., an Italian registrar and web hosting company

See also 
Araba (disambiguation)
Ariba
Arriba (disambiguation)